Torquigener flavimaculosus is a pufferfish of the family Tetraodontidae, capable of very rapid body inflation when threatened. Native to the Western Indian Ocean, it is also found in the Indo Pacific from the Persian Gulf to the Seychelles. Recorded first in the Mediterranean Sea in 1987, following a likely migration through the Suez Canal, it is now expanding westward.

References

Fish of the Indian Ocean
Fish described in 1983
flavimaculosus